Wicked City (novel series) is a series of novels written by Hideyuki Kikuchi.
 Wicked City (1987 film), a 1987 Japanese anime adaptation of the first Wicked City novel
 The Wicked City (1992 film), a live-action adaptation of the anime

Wicked City may also refer to:

Books
 The Wicked City (Isaac Bashevis Singer novel), a 1972 children's novel by Isaac Bashevis Singer

Film and TV
 The Wicked City, a 1916 comedy short starring Gypsy Abbott
 Wicked City (1949 film) (French: Hans le marin), a film starring Maria Montez
 Wicked City (TV series), a 2015 American crime drama series on ABC
 Wicked City (2022) a supernatural television series on Allblk.

Music
 Wicked City (musical), a musical by Chad Beguelin